Diana Dale Dickey (born September 29, 1961) is an American character actress who has worked in theater, film, and television. She began her career on stage, performing in the 1989 Broadway version of The Merchant of Venice, before appearing in popular revivals of A Streetcar Named Desire, Sweeney Todd and more off-Broadway and in regional theaters. She's the recipient of two Ovation Awards for her stage work in Los Angeles.

Known as a "consummate character actor," Dickey made her screen debut in 1995. She won the Independent Spirit Award for Best Supporting Female for her breakthrough performance as Merab in the 2010 independent drama film Winter's Bone. Over her career, she has appeared in more than 60 movies, most notably Changeling (2008), Super 8 (2011), Iron Man 3 (2013), Regression (2015), Hell or High Water (2016), Leave No Trace (2018) and Bloodline (2018). Her television credits including recurring roles on My Name Is Earl (2005–09), Breaking Bad (2009), True Blood (2012–13), Justified (2014), and Claws (2017–22). She also was a regular cast member on the second season of the HBO comedy series Vice Principals (2017), co-starred in the Netflix miniseries Unbelievable (2019), and currently features in Amazon's comedy-series reboot of A League of Their Own.

Dickey received widespread acclaim from critics for her lead performance in the 2022 romantic drama film A Love Song, for which she was nominated for the Independent Spirit Award for Best Lead Performance and the Gotham Independent Film Award for Outstanding Lead Performance.

Early life 
Diana Dale Dickey was born in Knoxville, Tennessee, and attended Bearden High School. She played several roles in high school productions, notably as Emily in Our Town. She later attended the University of Tennessee from 1979 to 1984, but left to pursue her acting career. On December 10, 2015, she returned to the University of Tennessee as a guest speaker, where she gave the commencement speech to Fall graduates, and was awarded an honorary Master of Fine Arts degree from the university.

Career 
Dickey has been working as a character actress in both mainstream and independent films since the 1990s. She made her television debut playing the recurring role of Opal McHone in CBS historical drama Christy from 1994 to 1995. The following year, she made her big screen debut in the comedy-drama film The Incredibly True Adventure of Two Girls in Love. She later had supporting parts in the made-for-television movies Cagney & Lacey: Together Again (1995), Prison of Secrets (1997) and Christy: Return to Cutter Gap (2000). She played Glyndora Roberts in the 2000 independent comedy film, Sordid Lives, and later returned to role in the Logo sitcom Sordid Lives: The Series (2008). She returned to franshise in 2017, playing different role in A Very Sordid Wedding (replacing Beth Grant as Sissy Hickey). Her other 2000s film credits include The Pledge (2001), Our Very Own (2005), and Changeling (2008).

Dickey guest-starred in a number of television series, including The X-Files, Frasier, CSI: Crime Scene Investigation, Gilmore Girls, The Closer and Ugly Betty. From 2005 to 2009, she had a recurring role as Patty the Daytime Hooker in the NBC comedy series, My Name Is Earl. In 2009, she had a recurring role in the AMC drama series, Breaking Bad. Dickey also performed in various stage production, include the Broadway production of The Merchant of Venice (1989) and in the 2009 stage adaptation of A Streetcar Named Desire and many other off-Broadway and regional theatres receiving two Ovation Awards.

Dickey received critical praise for her performance as Merab in 2010 independent drama film Winter's Bone opposite Jennifer Lawrence, winning the Independent Spirit Award for Best Supporting Female in February 2011. From 2012 to 2013, she played the role of Martha Bozeman in the fifth and sixth seasons of the HBO series True Blood. After Winter's Bone, Dickey appeared in the science fiction film Super 8 (2011) directed by J. J. Abrams, and the superhero film Iron Man 3, directed by Shane Black in 2013. She also was cast in Bonnie and Clyde: Dead and Alive miniseries in 2013. In 2014, she had a recurring role in the FX series Justified. In 2015 Dickey portrayed Rose Gray in the Spanish-American thriller film Regression, in which she co-stars with Ethan Hawke and Emma Watson.

Dickey had a recurring role of Juanda Husser in the TNT comedy-drama series, Claws from 2017 to 2022. In 2017, she starred in the second season of HBO dark comedy Vice Principals and in 2019 appeared in the Netflix miniseries Unbelievable. In 2022, she had a recurring role in the Amazon series A League of Their Own. She appeared in films Hell or High Water (2016), Leave No Trace (2018), Bloodline (2018) and Flag Day (2021).

In 2022, Dickey played the leading role in the drama film A Love Song. The performance received positive reviews from critics, notably from Los Angeles Times and Rolling Stone. The film marks the first leading role in her career. In her interview for IndieWire, Dickey said: "I fell between the cracks. I was not pretty enough in this category to be the leading lady and I wasn't quirky or odd enough in this category to be the only character actress". "Even in college, I tended to play everybody under 12 or over fifty. I think you finally grow into your age range and, sure enough, when I started getting into my mid-forties is when I started working more. I slowly built a career, but it was difficult." She received Independent Spirit Award for Best Lead Performance and Gotham Independent Film Award for Outstanding Lead Performance nominations for her role. Also that year, she played another leading role in the Irish drama film The Cry of Granuaile.
Valentine's Day 2023, she was the subject of a Jeopardy question.

Filmography

Film

Television

References

External links 

 

Living people
20th-century American actresses
21st-century American actresses
Actresses from Tennessee
American film actresses
American stage actresses
American television actresses
Independent Spirit Award for Best Supporting Female winners
People from Knoxville, Tennessee
University of Tennessee alumni
1961 births